Larry Goves (born 1980 in Cardiff, Wales) is a British composer.

A PhD student at the University of Southampton, his tutor is Michael Finnissy.  In addition to Undergraduate and Postgraduate studies at the Royal Northern College of Music, he has studied privately with Richard Barrett and Simon Holt. He has received commissions from the Nash Ensemble, the London Sinfonietta, the BBC Philharmonic and many others.  He is a founder and performer with the ensemble the House of Bedlam.  His music has been  broadcast by BBC Radio 3. The chamber piece walking underground (2000) was recorded by the London Sinfonietta on the NMC label, as has his solo oboe piece the tentacles of memory (2003), released on Dutton Epoch.

In 2011, Goves' work Virtual Airport was nominated for the Chamber-Scale Composition Prize at the Royal Philharmonic Society Music Awards.

References

External links
 Larry Goves London Sinfonietta profile
 Larry Goves Kings Place biography
 Larry Goves Exchange and Return website profile
 Larry Goves Sounds Underground website profile
 the house of bedlam Huddersfield Contemporary Music Festival profile of House of Bedlam

1980 births
21st-century classical composers
Living people
Welsh classical composers
Welsh male classical composers
Alumni of the Royal Northern College of Music
21st-century British male musicians